Milton Wakefield (born 1939 or 1940) is a Canadian provincial politician. He was the Saskatchewan Party member of the Legislative Assembly of Saskatchewan for the constituency of Lloydminster from 1999 to 2007.

References

Living people
Year of birth missing (living people)
Saskatchewan Party MLAs
21st-century Canadian politicians